The knockout stage of 2012 Indonesia Super League U-21 is scheduled to begin on 28 June 2012 and to be completed on 1 July 2012 with the final at the Kanjuruhan Stadium in Malang Regency. After the completion of the group stage on 23 June 2012, four teams qualified for the semi-finals (two from each group), which are to be played from 28 June 2012. Host clubs Arema FC U-21 failed to qualify for the semi-finals.

Qualified teams

Bracket

Semi-finals

Pelita U-21  vs Persisam U-21

Persipura U-21 vs Persela U-21

Third-placed

Final

References

Knockout stage